Chitoria ulupi, the tawny emperor, is a species of nymphalid butterfly found in tropical Asia.

Subspecies
Chitoria ulupi ulupi (Assam, Manipur, Burma)
Chitoria ulupi dubernardi (Oberthür) (western China: Yunnan)
Chitoria ulupi arakii (Naritomi) (Taiwan)
Chitoria ulupi kalaurica Tytler, 1926 (Burma)
Chitoria ulupi fulva Leech, 1891 (Korea, eastern China, Sichuan)
Chitoria ulupi tong Yoshino, 1997 (Guanxi)

References

Apaturinae
Butterflies described in 1889
Butterflies of Asia